Oleksandr Mykolayovych Kucher (born 22 October 1982) is a Ukrainian former professional footballer and current manager of Ukrainian club Dnipro-1.

He was a powerful defender who was good in the air and provided good coverage in the back. He could also play as a defensive midfielder.

A Shakhtar Donetsk player from 2006 until 2017, he won many honours including Premier League titles and the 2008–09 UEFA Cup. He made his senior international debut in 2006 and represented Ukraine when they co-hosted UEFA Euro 2012.

Club career
Kucher started his career with Youth Academy alumnus "Athlete" Kyiv and Arsenal Kyiv, playing 59 times and scoring 5 goals. He joined Metalurh Donetsk in 2002, spending a season on loan at Arsenal Kharkiv during the 2002–03 season, a season at Armenian side Banants Yerevan during the 2003–04 season and another spell with Arsenal in the 2004–05 season. He made 26 appearances for Arsenal over his two seasons on loan. He scored 3 goals in 19 appearances for Banants. Having made 9 appearances for Metalurh, Kucher moved to Metalist Kharkiv during the 2005–06 season playing 28 matches with his only two goals coming in 5–2 defeat to Chornomorets Odesa. Oleksandr joined Shakhtar Donetsk in the 2006–07 season. He made his debut for Shakhtar as a substitute in a 5–0 victory over his former club Metalist. He scored in a 4–1 victory over Metalurh Donetsk on 9 August 2009. He netted an extra time winner in the final of the 2011–12 Ukrainian Cup. Kucher scored a brace in a 3–1 victory over Dynamo Kyiv on 4 September 2012 in a man of the match performance.

On 11 March 2015, he was given the quickest red card in the history of the Champions League when he was sent off for foul on Thomas Müller in the third minute of a last 16 second leg against Bayern Munich which Bayern won 7–0.

International career
Kucher made his debut for the Ukraine national team on 15 August 2006 in a 6–0 friendly victory over Azerbaijan. He scored his first goal for Ukraine on 11 October 2006 in a 2–0 Euro 2008 qualifying match victory over Scotland. He was part of Ukraine's squad as they co-hosted UEFA Euro 2012 with Poland, but did not feature in the group stage exit. Four years later, Kucher was again part of his country's 23-man roster to participate in the UEFA Euro 2016. This time, he made one appearance for Ukraine, in a 1–0 loss to Poland, as Ukraine was once again eliminated at the group stage.

Career statistics

Club

International

Scores and results list Ukraine's goal tally first, score column indicates score after each Kucher goal.

Managerial

Honours
Shakhtar Donetsk
Vyshcha Liha/Ukrainian Premier League: 2007–08, 2009–10, 2010–11, 2011–12, 2012–13, 2013–14, 2016–17
Ukrainian Cup: 2007–08, 2010–11, 2011–12, 2012–13, 2015–16, 2016–17
Ukrainian Super Cup: 2008, 2010, 2012, 2013, 2014, 2015
UEFA Cup: 2008–09

References

External links
 
 
 Official site Oleksandr Kucher
 

1982 births
Armenian Premier League players
Association football defenders
Expatriate footballers in Armenia
Expatriate footballers in Turkey
FC Arsenal Kharkiv players
FC Karpaty Lviv players
FC Metalist Kharkiv players
FC Metalurh Donetsk players
FC Metalurh-2 Donetsk players
FC Shakhtar Donetsk players
FC Urartu players
Footballers from Kyiv
Kayserispor footballers
Living people
Süper Lig players
UEFA Cup winning players
UEFA Euro 2012 players
UEFA Euro 2016 players
Ukraine international footballers
Ukrainian expatriate footballers
Ukrainian expatriate sportspeople in Armenia
Ukrainian expatriate sportspeople in Turkey
Ukrainian footballers
Ukrainian Premier League players
Ukrainian First League players
Ukrainian Second League players
Ukrainian football managers
FC Metalist Kharkiv managers
SC Dnipro-1 managers
Ukrainian First League managers
Ukrainian Second League managers